The Maritime Football League (MFL) is a men's Canadian football minor league in the Maritime Provinces of Canada. The season runs from April until the end of June. The league consists of former CFL, U Sports, and high school football players.

Teams in 2023
Moncton Mustangs
Saint John Wanderers
Island Mariners
Nova Scotia Buccaneers
Valley Razors
Fredericton Fleet

Defunct teams
Capital Area Gladiators
Halifax Shockers
Moncton Marshals
Saint John Longhorns (Merged with Wanderers)
Super City Mean Green
UNBSJ Wolves (Joined AFL)
Dartmouth Knights
PEI Privateers (Became the Island Mariners in 2017)
Southern NB Ducks (Became the Valley Razors in 2022)
Halifax Harbour Hawks (Dissolved in the 2023 preseason)

Maritime Bowl Champions

I 2002 Halifax Shockers 21 Saint John Wanderers 19 (Hampton, N.B.)
II 2003 Saint John Wanderers  50 Halifax Shockers 12 (Halifax, N.S.)
III 2004 Moncton Marshals  30 Halifax Shockers 3 (Moncton, N.B.)
IV 2005 Saint John Wanderers  28 Dartmouth Knights 18 (Halifax, N.S.)
V 2006 Saint John Wanderers  52 Dartmouth Knights 26 (Saint John, N.B.)
VI 2007 Riverview Mustangs  23 Halifax Shockers 0 (Riverview, N.B.)
VII 2008 Riverview Mustangs  21 Saint John Wanderers 13 (Riverview, N.B.)
VIII 2009 Riverview Mustangs    16 Halifax Shockers 7 (Riverview, N.B.)
IX 2010 Moncton Mustangs 29 Dartmouth Knights 10 (Moncton, N.B.)
XI 2012 Halifax Shockers  45 Saint John Wanderers 6
XII 2013 Saint John Wanderers  39 Halifax Shockers 20
XIII 2014 Saint John Wanderers  48 Capital Area Gladiators 7
XIV 2015 Saint John Wanderers  36 Halifax Buccaneers 29
XV 2016  Saint John Wanderers  47 Moncton Mustangs 21
XVI 2017  Moncton Mustangs  43 Saint John Wanderers 23
XVII 2018 Saint John Wanderers 42 Moncton Mustangs 23
XVIII 2019  Moncton Mustangs  34 Saint John Wanderers 27
XIX 2021  Moncton Mustangs  26 Fredericton Fleet 14

Mariner Bowl Champions (Tier 2 Playoff Bowl)
I 2007 Dartmouth Knights 20 Saint John Longhorns 15 (Saint John, N.B.)
II 2008 Capital Area Gladiators 42 Saint John Longhorns 33 (Saint John, N.B.)
III 2009 Dartmouth Knights 41 P. E. I.  Privateers 14 (Dartmouth, N.S.)
Ended in 2010.

References

External links
Maritime Football League
Capital Area "DQ" Gladiators Football Club
Dartmouth Knights
Halifax Shockers
PEI Privateers
Mustang Football
Saint John Longhorns
Saint John Wanderers

2
Sport in the Maritimes